Rough is a 2014 Telugu romantic action comedy film directed by C. H. Subba Reddy. The movie is produced by M. Abilash on Sridevi Entertainments Banner while Aadi, Rakul Preet Singh and Srihari play pivotal roles. Mani Sharma composed the Music. Actor Srihari died before the film was released. The film received mixed reviews from critics and was an average hit at the box office.

It was dubbed into Hindi under the same title.

Plot
Chandhu is an orphan who falls for Nandhu, a college student and decides to marry her. Later on, he learns that Nandhu is the only sister of a rich businessman, Siddharth. One day, Chandhu meets Siddharth and reveals his desire to marry his sister. A shocked and upset Siddharth challenges Chandhu to make his sister fall in love with him.

Cast
Aadi as Chandu
Rakul Preet Singh as Nandu
Sri Hari as Siddharth
M. S. Narayana
Raghu Babu
Y. Kasi Viswanath as Chandu's father
Jaya Prakash Reddy
Ravi Prakash as Chandu's brother-in-law
Raja Ravindra as Police
Suhasini as Chandu's sister
Pavithra Lokesh as Chandu's mother
Tanikella Bharani as Sooraj's father
Ajay as Sooraj
Supreet as Sooraj's brother
Krishna Bhagawan as Dharmaraju

Music

The film soundtrack and background music were composed by Mani Sharma.  The soundtrack was marketed by Junglee Music. The soundtrack was unveiled on 3 November 2014 at JRC Function Hall in Hyderabad. Suriya attended the event as the chief guest while Rana Daggubati, Nithiin and Allari Naresh in attendance along with the film's principal cast & crew.

Reviewing the soundtrack, IndiaGlitz wrote "Mani Sharma's albums have always raised expectations.  This one is no exception.  Helped by the experienced Bhaskarabhatla, he delivers an album that has the potential to entertain sections of mass and class audiences. The choice of singers is the saving grace. He may not be back in full form but he proves that he is a thoroughgoing entertainer even in 2014."

References

External links
 

2014 films
Films shot in Telangana
Films scored by Mani Sharma
2010s Telugu-language films